Albin Kurti (born 24 March 1975) is a Kosovar Albanian politician and activist, serving as the prime minister of Kosovo since 22 March 2021, having previously served in that role between February and June 2020.

He came to prominence in 1997 as the vice-president of the University of Pristina student union, and a main organizer of non-violent demonstrations in 1997 and 1998. When Adem Demaçi became the political representative of the Kosovo Liberation Army (KLA), Kurti worked in his office. He has been member of the Assembly of Kosovo since 2010 in three consecutive legislatures.

Early life
Albin Kurti was born on 24 March 1975 in Pristina, at the time part of Yugoslavia. Kurti's father originates from an Albanian family from the village of Sukobin (Albanian: Sukubinë) in Ulcinj Municipality, Montenegro; an engineer, he moved to Pristina in search for employment. Kurti's mother is a retired elementary school teacher, born and educated in Pristina. Kurti finished his elementary and middle education in Prishtina. In 1993 he got admitted at the Faculty of Engineering at the University of Pristina as a top applicant, having scored 100% in the admission exam. He graduated in 2003 in Telecommunications and Computer Engineering.

He is married to Norwegian Rita Augestad Knudsen, and they have a daughter named Lea. In addition to his native Albanian, he also speaks Serbo-Croatian, French and English. Besides his Kosovo citizenship, Kurti also holds Albanian citizenship and has voted in Albanian elections.

Rise to prominence and arrest
In Pristina, Kurti attended primary and secondary schools from 1981–1993, then studied electrical engineering at the University of Pristina. During this time, the Socialist Federal Republic of Yugoslavia broke up into its former republics, which were now striving for independence (Croatia, Slovenia, Macedonia, Bosnia-Herzegovina, Montenegro). Against the background of increasing ethnic tensions between Kosovar Serbs and Kosovar Albanians, Serbia began in 1989 with a withdrawal of essential Kosovar-Albanian rights and reprisals against the Albanian majority. The Kosovar Albanian professors and students at the University of Pristina were therefore forced to move the lectures to private rooms from 1991–1996, where Kurti also completed his studies. In 2001 he was still studying computer science.

Albin Kurti first came to prominence in October 1997, as one of the leaders of the student protests in Kosovo. Albanian students protested against the occupation of the university campus by the Yugoslav police. The protests were crushed violently, but the students and Kurti did not stop the resistance and they organized other protests in the following years. In July 1998, Kurti joined the Kosovo Liberation Army as an assistant of the political representative Adem Demaçi. These actions made him a target of the Yugoslav police.

In April 1999, during the NATO bombing of Yugoslavia, Kurti was arrested and beaten by Yugoslav forces. He was first sent to the Dubrava prison, but as the Serbian army withdrew from Kosovo, they transferred him to a prison in Požarevac on 10 June 1999. Later that year, he was charged with "jeopardizing Yugoslavia's territorial integrity and conspiring to commit an enemy activity linked to terrorism" and was sentenced to 15 years in prison.

Political career
Kurti was released in December 2001 by Yugoslavia's post-Milošević government after being pardoned by President Vojislav Koštunica amid international pressure. Since his release, he has worked outside party politics in Kosovo but has been a severe critic of the United Nations Interim Administration Mission in Kosovo (UNMIK) and of corruption. He organised non-violent protests in support of the families of those whose relatives disappeared in the war, and in favor of Kosovo's self-determination. On 23 April 2003 Kurti graduated with a degree in Computer and Telecommunications Sciences from the University of Prishtina. He was an activist for the Action for Kosovo Network (AKN), which was formed in 1997, and was a movement whose mission focused on human rights and social justice, education, culture and art.

On 12 June 2005 AKN activists wrote the slogan "No negotiations, Self-Determination" on the on walls of UNMIK buildings. The police with the help of UN Police, arrested, jailed and convicted hundreds of activists, including Kurti. AKN then changed its name to the Self-Determination Movement (Vetëvendosje). Vetëvendosje demanded a referendum on the status of Kosovo, stating "only with a referendum as a use of international right for self-determination, we can realise a democratic solution for Kosovo instead of negotiations which compromise freedom".

In February 2007 Vetëvendosje organized a protest against the Ahtisaari Plan, which according to them divided Kosovo along ethnic lines and did not give the people of Kosovo what they were striving for. The protest turned violent and the Romanian UN Police killed two unarmed protesters and injured 80 others with plastic and rubber bullets. Kurti was arrested. He was detained until July, and then kept under house arrest. Amnesty International criticised the irregularities in his prosecution. He was eventually sentenced to nine months. Kurti was an advocate of "active nonviolent resistance".

Vetëvendosje joined the political spectrum of Kosovo by running in the elections of 2010 for the first time. Albin Kurti was the candidate for Prime Minister, though Vetëvendosje only scored 12.69% and won 14 out of 120 seats in the assembly, becoming the third political force in the country. Vetëvendosje criticized the Brussels Agreement between Kosovo and Serbia. The Vetëvendosje MPs, including Kurti, were escorted out of the parliament by police for disrupting the session of the assembly.

Kurti ran for Prime Minister again in the following elections in 2014, but Vetëvendosje was third again, only gaining 16 seats. Vetëvendosje and Kurti personally were involved in the protests within the parliament that earned international attention by setting off tear gas in the parliament on multiple cases.

In the 2017 election Vetëvendosje doubled in size, becoming the biggest political party in Kosovo and winning 32 seats (the most as an individual party compared to other parties in that election); his party took 200.135 votes (27,49%). They were still defeated by the big PANA coalition that took 245.627 (33,74%). Albin Kurti became the most-voted politician in Kosovo. During this term, Kurti was the leader of the opposition and Vetëvendosje managed to put strong pressure on the government in coordination with the other opposition party, LDK. On 3 January 2018 Kurti was sentenced to 1 year and 6 months in prison on probation for his role in setting off the tear-gas in 2015.

Prime Minister Ramush Haradinaj resigned in July 2019, taking Kosovo to early elections in October 2019. In the elections that followed, Kurti's Vetëvendosje won the largest share of the electorate with 221.001 (26,27% or 29 seats) and remained the first political force in Kosovo, with Kurti's share of votes increasing further in comparison to 2017. He became Prime Minister of Kosovo in early February 2020.

On 26 November 2019, an earthquake struck Albania. Kurti visited Durrës on Friday to survey the damage and stressed the importance for institutional cooperation between both Kosovo and Albania.

On 18 March 2020, Kurti sacked Interior Minister Agim Veliu (LDK) due to his support for declaring a state of emergency to handle the coronavirus pandemic, which would have given power to the Kosovo Security Council chaired by Hashim Thaçi (PDK). The Democratic League of Kosovo, the junior partner leader of the coalition, filed a no-confidence vote motion in retaliation for the sacking and on 25 March 82 members of the Kosovo Assembly voted in favor of the motion becoming the first government to be voted out of power due to disagreements over how to handle the coronavirus pandemic.

The Kurti cabinet continued as a caretaker government, until 3 June 2020, when Avdullah Hoti was elected as the next Prime Minister.

On 26 January 2021, Kurti was barred from running in the 2021 Kosovan parliamentary election by Kosovo’s election complaints panel, as he had been convicted of a crime less than three years prior to the election. In spite of this, the party went on to win by a landslide with 50.28% of the vote.

Prime Minister of Kosovo

First term

On 3 February 2020, Albin Kurti was elected Prime Minister of Kosovo with 66 votes in favor and 10 abstains, 34 opposition MPs boycotted the vote and left the Kosovo assembly building.

One of the first decisions by Kurti and his cabinet was to repeal the unpopular pay raise awarded to ministers by the preceding Haradinaj government and return salaries to their previous amount. As a result, the Prime Minister's monthly wage set at €2,950 will return to €1,500 for Kurti.

As part of his government's policy platform, Kurti seeks to introduce a three monthly period of military conscription service in Kosovo, and he views it important to the country's defences.

Countries visited
List of official visits abroad made by Albin Kurti as Prime Minister.

Second term

Kurti was elected Prime Minister of Kosovo for a second time on 22 March 2021 with 67 members of the assembly voting in favour and 30 members against.

Kurti condemned the 2022 Kosovo protests.

Energy crisis 2021–
In 2021, Kurti's government faced the biggest energy crisis since 2010, which led the government to declare a state of emergency for energy on December 24, 2021.

Dialogue with Serbia

Justice reforms
During the election campaign, Kurti had promised Vetting and the reform of the justice system. After the victory in the elections, the Kurti government brought the file on Vetting and justice reform to the Assembly of Kosovo on September 4, 2022. 

While on February 2, the Kurti government successfully passed the law on the Bureau of Confiscation of Unjustified Assets but it was criticized by the opposition that according to them the law is not compatible with the Constitution of Kosovo, sending the law for interpretation to the Constitutional Court of Kosovo.

Political positions

Unification of Kosovo and Albania 
Albin Kurti is a strong supporter of direct-democracy and he has often criticized the Constitution of Kosovo for not allowing direct referendums. One topic that he thinks should be decided on through a referendum is the unification of Kosovo and Albania. Kurti has continuously criticized the third article of the constitution for not allowing the referendum to happen. In a rally with Vetëvendosje supporters in 2018, Kurti stated that "We want to have the right of Kosovo to join Albania, but we would not start the third Balkan war for this goal." Following the 2019 election and LVV electoral success, Kurti stated that Kosovo Albanians were not after territorial and political unification with Albania at all costs and instead sought "integration with Albania and the EU, through the success of Kosovo as a state." Kurti has however stated that should a referendum be held on possible unification he would vote in favour.

Serbia 

Kurti has been known of having a strong opinion on the dialogue between Kosovo and Serbia. He has continuously criticized Kosovo's position in its negotiations with Serbia, claiming that the dialogue should be based on conditions and reciprocity. He has further criticized Kosovo for not conditioning the dialogue with Serbia returning the bodies of missing persons from the Kosovo war buried in mass graves in Serbia, Serbia paying war reparations to Kosovo, and the return of the stolen pension funds and artifacts. Following the 2019 election, Kurti said that "solid dialogue" and "reciprocity" was needed in the process of normalizing relations with Serbia. Kurti wants Kosovo to first negotiate with its Serb minority and the European Union, and then to go to negotiations with Serbia. He considers future dialogue with Kosovo's minorities and the EU "a top priority" for going forward.

United States

During his first term as a Prime Minister, Kurti had a bad relationship with Donald Trump and his administration. Kurti accused the special envoy sent by Trump, Richard Grenell, of discussing the Kosovo–Serbia land swap.

Kurti's opponent Hashim Thaçi was supported by Richard Grenell. Grenell has been demanding for weeks that Kosovo must unconditionally lift punitive tariffs imposed on imports from Serbia so that a "deal" he has championed, namely the establishment of direct rail and air connections between Kosovo and Serbia, can be enforced as soon as possible. Kurti countered this by saying that Kosovo could only lift the tariffs if Serbia, for its part, also abolished trade restrictions.

In October 2020, Kurti endorsed the Democratic nominee Joe Biden to become US president.

Annotations

References

External links

|-

1975 births
Living people
Kosovan prisoners and detainees
Politicians from Pristina
Vetëvendosje politicians
Leaders of political parties
Albanian nationalists in Kosovo
Prime ministers of Kosovo
Kosovan people of Montenegrin descent